Deh-e Miran (also Romanized as Deh-e Mīrān and  Deh Mīrān) is a village in Susan-e Gharbi Rural District, Susan District, Izeh County, Khuzestan Province, Iran. At the 2006 census, its population was 168, in 27 families.

References 

Populated places in Izeh County